"Past the Point of Rescue" is a song written by Mick Hanly, and covered by American country music artist Hal Ketchum.  It was released in February 1992 as the third single and title track from Ketchum's album Past the Point of Rescue. It was written by Mick Hanly (of Moving Hearts) and had originally been recorded by Mary Black who had a hit with it in Ireland in 1988 and included it on her album No Frontiers. Ketchum's version of the song reached number 2 on the Billboard Hot Country Singles & Tracks chart in May 1992 and number 1 on the RPM Country Tracks chart in Canada.

Music video
The music video was directed by Steve Boyle and premiered in early 1992.

Cover versions
"Past the Point of Rescue" has been recorded by several other artists, most notably the Dixie Chicks on their 1992 album Little Ol' Cowgirl.
Norwegian country rock group Hellbillies has made a locally successful cover version featuring Norwegian lyrics about a reindeer hunter who gets lost in the mountain.
Celtic Thunder covered the song for their 2012 album and DVD, Voyage.
Karen Damen covered the song in 2020 with one of the contenders in the voice senior Belgium (Marie-Jeanne) shortly after the show's final.
Mary Black an Irish Folk Singer covered this song in 1989 on the album No Frontiers.

Chart performance

Year-end charts

References

1992 singles
Hal Ketchum songs
The Chicks songs
Song recordings produced by Allen Reynolds
Curb Records singles
1988 songs